Arthur S. "Old Hoss" Twineham (November 26, 1866 – February 3, 1905) was a Major League Baseball catcher.

, he is the only Major League Baseball player known to have died in China.

References

External links
Baseball-Reference.com page

St. Louis Browns (NL) players
1866 births
1905 deaths
Baseball players from Illinois
19th-century baseball players
Minor league baseball managers
Leavenworth Soldiers players
Bloomington Reds players
Denver Grizzlies (baseball) players
Denver Mountaineers players
Ottumwa (minor league baseball) players
Spokane Bunchgrassers players
Pendleton Ho Hos players
Butte (minor league baseball) players
Missoula (minor league baseball) players
Montgomery Colts players
St. Joseph Saints players
Sioux City Cornhuskers players
Detroit Tigers (Western League) players
Grand Rapids Bob-o-links players
Chatham Reds players
Omaha Omahogs players
Wheeling Stogies players
Mansfield Haymakers players
Des Moines Hawkeyes players